Zvonko Bezjak (born Antun Petar Bezjak on 29 June 1935) is a retired Croatian hammer thrower of Slovenian origin. He competed for Yugoslavia at the 1960 Summer Olympics and finished in sixth place. He won a gold medal at the 1963 Mediterranean Games.

As a teenager Bezjak tried fencing and wrestling before changing to athletics. In 1953 he won the Yugoslav junior pentathlon championships, where he performed well not only in throwing, but also in sprint events, running 100 m in 11.3 and 200 m in 23.2 seconds. Next year he moved from his native Varaždin to Zagreb, and received a degree in economics there in 1960. During his hammer throwing career Bezjak had a strong rivalry with Krešimir Račić, with Bezjak winning the Yugoslav title in 1956, 1958, 1960 and 1963 and Račić in 1954, 1955, 1957, 1959, 1961, 1962 and 1964. Bezjak retired in 1965. He did not pursue a coaching career, and instead worked for the catering company Ključice in Novi Marof until 1991.

He had a sister Vida, whose son Zlatko Bezjak became a competitive javelin thrower.

References

1935 births
Living people
Sportspeople from Varaždin
Croatian male hammer throwers
Yugoslav male hammer throwers
Olympic male hammer throwers
Olympic athletes of Yugoslavia
Athletes (track and field) at the 1960 Summer Olympics
Croatian people of Slovenian descent
Mediterranean Games gold medalists for Yugoslavia
Mediterranean Games gold medalists in athletics
Athletes (track and field) at the 1963 Mediterranean Games
Balkan Athletics Championships winners